Satymkul Dzhumanazarov (17 September 1951 – 2 April 2007) was a Soviet athlete from Kyrgyzstan who competed mainly in the marathon. He competed for the USSR at the 1980 Summer Olympics held in Moscow, Soviet Union, where he won the bronze medal in the men's marathon.

He came fifth at the 1981 Tokyo Marathon with a time of 2:12:31 hours.

International competitions

References

External links
sports-reference
1980 Year Ranking

1951 births
2007 deaths
People from Talas Region
Soviet male long-distance runners
Soviet male marathon runners
Kyrgyzstani male long-distance runners
Kyrgyzstani male marathon runners
Olympic athletes of the Soviet Union
Olympic bronze medalists for the Soviet Union
Athletes (track and field) at the 1980 Summer Olympics
Honoured Masters of Sport of the USSR
Olympic bronze medalists in athletics (track and field)
Medalists at the 1980 Summer Olympics